Kirby: Canvas Curse, known in Europe as Kirby: Power Paintbrush, is a platforming video game developed by HAL Laboratory, published by Nintendo for the Nintendo DS and released in 2005 and is the first Kirby game to be released for the system. While Kirby: Canvas Curse is a platformer, it does not play like a traditional Kirby video game, as it solely requires the use of the stylus. A Wii U sequel, Kirby and the Rainbow Curse, was released on January 22, 2015 in Japan, February 20, 2015 in North America, May 8, 2015 in Europe, and May 9, 2015 in Australia. The game was later re-released for the Wii U's Virtual Console in Europe and Australia in December 2015, in Japan in February 2016, and in North America in October 2016.

Gameplay 

Unlike most previous Kirby games, the player does not directly control Kirby with a directional pad or any buttons. Instead, the player only uses the stylus and touch screen to control Kirby, who rolls around in ball form.  The player can draw rainbow lines, which Kirby will roll on. These rainbow paths can form ramps or bridges for Kirby to cross, or walls to protect him from enemy projectiles. Drawing paths depletes the player's rainbow ink supplies, which recharges slowly while Kirby is in the air or on a path, but quickly when Kirby is on the ground. 

The player can use the stylus to stun enemies by tapping on it. Afterwards, the player can either allow Kirby to roll into the enemy with his own momentum or by dashing to defeat the enemy. Defeating certain kinds of enemies by either dashing into them or touching them while stunned causes Kirby to gain one of several special abilities, which may be used at any time by tapping Kirby himself. 

Kirby: Canvas Curse spans eight worlds, with all but one having three levels. A variety of themes are used throughout the game. These themes range from a volcanic area to a frozen area. The objective of every level in the game is to reach a rainbow-colored doorway. As the player makes progress in the game, the environmental hazards become far more plentiful. In one level, the player must maneuver Kirby quickly enough to avoid getting defeated by an ever-rising body of lava. Occasionally, Kirby will come across a barrier, which prevents the paint lines from being created inside of them, forcing Kirby to do nothing, but roll, dash, and use a power (if applicable). Portions of these levels can be played in Rainbow Run mode, where speed and amount of paint used are key factors in the player's success.

At the end of each world except for world seven, Kirby must face a boss. In worlds one through six, the first time he completes them, he must face one of each boss - Paint Roller, Kracko, or King Dedede (all of whom must be battled twice). With the exception of the final boss, all bosses are mini-game based. The boss of world eight is the main villain of Kirby: Canvas Curse, Drawcia Sorceress. Drawcia starts out in her standard form. Upon defeat, she will transform into a large ball of paint with five eyes and a mouth called Drawcia Soul.

Kirby: Canvas Curse features special collectibles called Medals, which can be used to unlock secret features in the game, such as characters, sound tests, and alternate paint colors. These medals may be obtained through the main levels, through defeating bosses, or through the Rainbow Run challenge mode, where Kirby must complete a portion of one of the main levels, with the objective being either getting through it as fast as possible, or getting through it while trying to use as little paint as possible.

Plot 
One day, a strange portal appears in the sky, and out of it comes the witch Drawcia. Drawcia casts a spell over Dream Land, turning it into a world of paint. Upon fleeing back into the portal she came through, Kirby gives chase, finding himself in Drawcia's paint-themed world. The witch curses Kirby, turning him into a limbless ball. After Drawcia escapes, the Magical Paintbrush (Power Paintbrush in the European version) turns to the player to help Kirby. Kirby sets off to find and defeat Drawcia to restore Dream Land to its normal state. Along the way, Drawcia creates replicas of Kirby's oldest opponents to slow him down. These include Paint Roller, Kracko, Kracko Jr., and King Dedede. Kirby eventually confronts Drawcia, but after her defeat she transforms into the fearsome Drawcia Soul. Kirby defeats her once and for all and peace is restored.

Reception 

Kirby: Canvas Curse received "favorable" reviews according to the review aggregation website Metacritic. In Japan, Famitsu gave it a score of one nine, two eights, and one nine for a total of 34 out of 40.

1UP.com called it "genuinely excellent", saying that "it's a welcome reinvention of gaming's most overplayed genre" and later concluded that Canvas Curse is "the DS's first great game". The stylus gameplay has also been noted, with IGN hailing it as "incredibly innovative", GameSpy saying it is "quite rewarding", and GameSpot calling it "a satisfying part of the gameplay." Official Nintendo Magazine ranked it the 96th best game available on Nintendo platforms. On the other hand, Plays editor disagreed, noting that "it's innovative... but for me, that's not enough."

The New York Times gave it a very favorable review and called it "tremendous fun". The Sydney Morning Herald gave it four stars out of five, saying that "Kirby's use of touch-screen technology provides a fresh and engaging game." However, Detroit Free Press gave it three stars out of four, stating that "there is some nice innovation, such as levels that are completely black until Kirby bumps into lanterns that put off light. And as we all know, in dark places like this, it's good to have a friend."

Kirby: Canvas Curse was the third best-selling game in Japan during its week of release at 75,365 units sold. Famitsu annual sales for the region show the game sold 276,418 copies by the end of 2005. According to NPD Group, the game sold just under 80,000 copies in North America during the month of June 2005. The following month, it was the top-selling DS game in the region at 50,000 copies.

Notes

References

External links 
 Official site
 

2005 video games
Video games about curses
HAL Laboratory games
Kirby (series) platform games
Nintendo DS games
Video games developed in Japan
Video games about magic
Video games about witchcraft
Video games about shapeshifting
Virtual Console games
Virtual Console games for Wii U
Video games scored by Jun Ishikawa
Video games scored by Tadashi Ikegami
Video games produced by Kensuke Tanabe